Indonesia–Taiwan relations are foreign relations between Indonesia and Taiwan. Currently, Indonesia does not officially recognize Republic of China (Taiwan) as it adopted One-China Policy; officially recognizing only the People’s Republic of China since 1950. Despite geopolitical constraints, the relations between two countries remain flourished over times, the opportunities for widening and deepening the relations have grown.

History 
Ethnically and linguistically indigenous peoples of Taiwan and native Indonesians are related, as both belong to Austronesian ancestry. The "out of Taiwan theory", suggests that the Austronesian-speaking people — the ancestors of Indonesians — came from Taiwan during the "Austronesian Expansion" which began 4,000–5,000 years ago. Nevertheless, the question of origin and ancestry of present-day Austronesian-speaking populations remains controversial.

Prior to the Independence of Indonesia, during Dutch East Indies era in early 20th century, Republic of China has reached out to people of the Indies, especially towards Overseas Chinese. Back in 1900, the socio-religious organization Tiong Hoa Hwe Koan, also known as the Chinese Association, was founded in the East Indies. Their goal was to urge ethnic Chinese in the Indies to support the revolutionary movement in mainland China. The 1912 founding of the Republic of China coincided with a growing Chinese-nationalist movement within the Indies. At that time, many Chinese Indonesians had dual citizenship and remained loyal to the Republic of China.

After Indonesia proclaimed its independence in 1945 and won recognition in 1949, Indonesia briefly recognized the Republic of China between period 1949 to 1950. However, after the defeat of Republic of China Armed Forces to People's Liberation Army, and its retreat to Taiwan, a former Japanese colony, in 1950 Indonesia shifted its official recognition to People's Republic of China and opted for One-China policy.

In 1965, after a political turmoil in Indonesia that led to the fall of Sukarno and the rise of Suharto, the relations between Indonesia and Communist China worsened as the two nations severed diplomatic relations. However Indonesia did not re-establish diplomatic relations with Republic of China, despite sharing anti-communist sentiments at that time. Nevertheless, Indonesia and Taiwan enjoy close relations since the late 1960s.

Indonesia has established an Indonesian Economic and Trade Office in Taipei since 1970, while Taiwan reciprocated by establishing Taipei Economic and Trade Office (TETO) in Jakarta since 1971. In October 2015, the Ministry of Foreign Affairs announced the planned opening of the second TETO in Surabaya, East Java. The office was officially opened on 18 December 2015 and started its operation on 21 December 2015.

Economic relations

Indonesia is Taiwan's 10th-largest trade partner, with annual two-way trade volume reaching US$12.3 billion. For Indonesia, Taiwan is their 9th-largest foreign direct investment source, with total investments amounting to US$15.3 billion, generating about 1 million job opportunities, while there are around 8,000 Taiwanese managerial and technical personnel working in Indonesia. According to the Investment Coordinating Board, 1,475 Taiwanese investors had invested in Indonesia up to June 2012.

On 12 May 2016, both sides signed an agricultural cooperation agreement in Taipei, which includes agrifood, horticulture, dairy farming and slope crops for areas of cooperation and investment.

Education
Currently, there are around 4,500 Indonesian students studying in Taiwan.

Citizens of the Republic of China (Taiwan) residing in Indonesia are served by two international schools:
 Jakarta Taipei School (雅加達臺灣學校)
 Surabaya Taipei International School (印尼泗水臺灣學校)

Tourism
Taiwan is the 8th-largest source of visitors to Indonesia. In 2012, 216,535 Taiwanese tourists visited Indonesia. With 88 flights per week between the two countries, the popular tourist destinations for Taiwanese visitors are Bali, Borobudur and Jakarta.

Sports
The Taiwan External Trade Development Council has been organizing the Taiwan Excellence Happy Run in Jakarta since 2014.

Migrant workers

Indonesia is Taiwan's largest source of foreign migrant workers. In 2012, there were around 185,000 Indonesian migrant workers in Taiwan, equal to 42 percent of the total foreign workforce in Taiwan. The number has continually risen since January 2011, when the Agreements on the Placement of Indonesian Manpower in Taiwan was signed. In 2014, the figure raised to 190,000 Indonesian laborers out of total 450,000 foreign workers in Taiwan. Indonesian President Joko Widodo has praised Taiwan for its friendly treatment of Indonesian workers.

See also
 Indonesians in Taiwan
 Chinese Indonesians

References

External links 
 Indonesian Economic and Trade Office (KDEI) in Taipei
 Taipei Economic and Trade Office (TETO) in Jakarta

 
Taiwan
Bilateral relations of Taiwan